A techno-thriller or technothriller is a hybrid genre drawing from science fiction, thrillers, spy fiction, action, and war novels. They include a disproportionate amount (relative to other genres) of technical details on their subject matter (typically military technology); only hard science fiction tends towards a comparable level of supporting detail on the technical side. The inner workings of technology and the mechanics of various disciplines (espionage, martial arts, politics) are thoroughly explored, and the plot often turns on the particulars of that exploration. This genre began to exist and establish itself in the early 20th century with further developments and focus on the genre in the mid 20th century.

History 
The genre dates back to as early as the 20th century and a lot of techno-thrillers are comparable to science-fiction and many of the subcategories within science-fiction. The popularity of the genre had evolved significantly and it continues to be a growing genre that is still publicly experimented on and thriving today.

One of the earliest techno-thrillers is thought to be The Satan Bug (1962) by Alistair MacLean, while a lot of what counted for science fiction in the pre-war and early post-war Soviet Union were essentially techno-thrillers, full of technical details and featuring complex spy-rich plots, one of the most enduring example being the Grigory Adamov's The Mystery of the Two Oceans (1939). Michael Crichton and Tom Clancy are considered to be the fathers of the "modern techno-thriller"; Crichton's book The Andromeda Strain and Clancy's book The Hunt for Red October set out the type example which defined the genre, although many authors had been writing similar material earlier, such as Craig Thomas, whom BBC News also credits as an early innovator.

Style 
Techno-thrillers focus strongly on details, especially on the technology, which is frequently of military origin. Techno-thrillers tend to have a broad scope in the narrative, and can often be regarded as contemporary speculative fiction; world wars are a common topic. Techno-thrillers often overlap, as far as the genre goes, with near-future science fiction, military fiction, and espionage fiction. To the extent that technology is now a dominant aspect of modern global culture, most modern thrillers are "techno-thrillers" in broad sense, and the genre is somewhat diffuse. Techno-thrillers blur smoothly into the category of hard science fiction; the defining characteristics of techno-thriller are an emphasis on real-world or plausible near-future technology. There is often a focus on military or military-political action. Techno-thrillers also overlap with conspiracy fiction and apocalyptic fiction. While techno-thrillers borrow concepts and ideas from other forms and styles of other genres, notably science-fiction and its subcategories, it is a fresh and still developing style with it being more of a hybrid genre, more closely related to thrillers and technology. Since technology is always changing, that brings a fresh take on techno thrillers with advancement always on the scope.

Varieties 
Techno-thrillers have at least five varieties within the genre. These are military techno-thrillers, spy techno-thrillers, crypto-techno-thrillers, disaster techno-thrillers, and science-fiction techno-thrillers.

 Military techno-thrillers: These techno-thrillers focus mainly on military issues and problems. They have to do with military centralism in the story and are focused on martial technology. Tom Clancy is credited with having huge success within this category.
 Spy techno-thrillers: These techno-thrillers are similar to traditional techno-thrillers while remaining true to the pace and they borrow from spy-fi as well. The main aim of this category is to write about espionage as well as tradecraft. They have to do with defeating a rival enemy or enemies and stopping them from achieving their goals.
 Crypto-techno-thrillers: These techno-thrillers are the kind that has the story and the drama unfold most of the time online.
 Disaster techno-thrillers: These techno-thrillers usually have to do with terrible things happening such as an earthquake or any natural disaster, war and nuclear wars, apocalypse, and the end of the world themes are also prevalent. Most times, the problem is grand and affects a worldwide level instead of a local one. The goal of the protagonist is to survive instead of fixing the crisis. A prominent modern day writer to this subgenre is Boyd Morrison, author of Typhoon Fury, a New York Times best seller.
 Science-fiction techno-thrillers: Are heavily reliant on science fiction and are often set in the future. Techno-thrillers borrow concepts from science fiction. An example of this techno-thriller would be the science behind Jurassic Park.

See also 
 Cyberpunk
 List of techno-thriller novels
 Military science fiction
 Spy-fi (subgenre)
 Techno-horror

References 

 
Thriller genres